Regis Le Bris (born 6 December 1975) is a French football manager and former player. He is currently the manager of French Ligue 1 side FC Lorient.

Personal life 
His nephew is Théo Le Bris, whom he currently manages at Lorient.

Managerial statistics

References

External links
 

1975 births
Living people
Footballers from Brittany
Sportspeople from Finistère
French footballers
Association football midfielders
French football managers
FC Lorient managers
Ligue 1 managers